Slavotin Point (‘Nos Slavotin’ \'nos 'sla-vo-tin\) is the low rocky point on the southeast coast of Nelson Island in the South Shetland Islands, Antarctica forming the east side of the entrance to Tuida Cove and the west side of the entrance to Vichina Cove.

The point is named after the settlement of Slavotin in Northwestern Bulgaria.

Location
British mapping in 1968.

Maps
 South Shetland Islands. Scale 1:200000 topographic map No. 3373. DOS 610 - W 62 58. Tolworth, UK, 1968.
 Antarctic Digital Database (ADD). Scale 1:250000 topographic map of Antarctica. Scientific Committee on Antarctic Research (SCAR). Since 1993, regularly upgraded and updated.

References
 Slavotin Point. SCAR Composite Gazetteer of Antarctica.
 Bulgarian Antarctic Gazetteer. Antarctic Place-names Commission. (details in Bulgarian, basic data in English)

External links
 Slavotin Point. Copernix satellite image

Headlands of the South Shetland Islands
Bulgaria and the Antarctic